Ono Genmyō (小野玄妙, 1883–1939) was a Japanese scholar of Buddhism and Buddhist art. A native of Kanagawa Prefecture, Ono's large body of work includes the seminal The Artworks and History of Buddhism. He died of a cerebral hemorrhage in 1939.

References

1883 births
1939 deaths